The 76th Pennsylvania House of Representatives District is located in central Pennsylvania and has been represented by Stephanie Borowicz since 2019.

District profile
The 76th District encompasses part of Union County and all of Clinton County and includes the following areas: 

Clinton County
Union County

Buffalo Township
Hartleton
Hartley Township
Kelly Township
Lewis Township
Lewisburg
Limestone Township
Mifflinburg
New Berlin
West Buffalo Township

Representatives

References

Government of Centre County, Pennsylvania
Clinton County
76